Kuma Academy is a Taiwanese non-profit civil defense organization which provides training to civilians on a variety of topics.

Overview 
Kuma Academy provides civil defense training to civilians in Taiwan. Classes cover topics like first aid and media literacy (intended to combat disinformation from China).

Kuma Academy has also provided training in open-source intelligence and cybersecurity. According to Kuma their goal is "to decentralise civil defence."

History 

Kuma Academy was founded by Puma Shen and Ho Cheng-Hui.

Interest in the organization, and civil defense overall, dramatically increased following the Russian invasion of Ukraine. In September 2022, the Kuma Academy had a waitlist more than 3,000 long for its classes.

In 2022, retired businessman Robert Tsao pledged NTD $600m to Kuma Academy.

See also 
 Forward Alliance
 Irregular warfare 
 Militia

References

External links 
 

Non-profit organizations based in Taiwan
Civil defense in Taiwan
Open-source intelligence